The Ministry of National Policies and Economic Affairs  (Sinhala: ජාතික ප්‍රතිපත්ති හා ආර්ථික කටයුතු අමාත්‍යාංශය Jāthika Prathipaththi hā Ārthika Katayuthu Amathyanshaya; Tamil: தேசிய கொள்கைகள் மற்றும் பொருளாதார அலுவல்கள் அமைச்சு) is a cabinet ministry of the Government of Sri Lanka responsible for formulation of national economic-, national development and monetary policies and strategies, and for coordinating with international agencies and mobilizing foreign resources for the country's economic development.

List of ministers

Parties

See also
Banking in Sri Lanka
Economy of Sri Lanka
Ministry of Finance (Sri Lanka)
Sri Lankan Rupee

References

External links
 Ministry of National Policies and Economic Affairs 
 Government of Sri Lanka

Lists of government ministers of Sri Lanka
Government ministries of Sri Lanka